Thomas Franklin Holgate (1859–1945) was a Canadian-born American mathematician and academic administrator. He served as the president of Northwestern University from 1904 to 1906, and from 1916 to 1919.

Early life
Thomas F. Holgate was born on April 8, 1859 in Hastings County, Canada. He graduated from the University of Toronto with a bachelor's degree in 1884 and a master's degree in 1889. He earned a PhD in Mathematics from Clark University in 1893.

Career
Holgate joined the faculty at Northwestern University in 1893. He served as its president from 1904 to 1906, and from 1916 to 1919.

Death and legacy
Holgate died at his home in Evanston on April 11, 1945. The Thomas F. Holgate Library on the campus of Bennett College was named in his honor.

References

1859 births
1945 deaths
People from Hastings County
Canadian emigrants to the United States
University of Toronto alumni
Clark University alumni
Northwestern University faculty
Presidents of Northwestern University